The 1892 Massachusetts gubernatorial election was held on November 8, 1892. Incumbent Democratic Governor William Russell was re-elected to a third term in office over Republican Lt. Governor William H. Haile.

General election

Results

See also
 1892 Massachusetts legislature

References

Governor
1892
Massachusetts
November 1892 events